The following is a list of Japanese nuclear power plants. 
After the Fukushima Daiichi nuclear disaster, all 17 major plants were shut down. As of 2022, only 6 out of 17 major nuclear power plants operate in the country, operated by the Kyushu Electric Power (Kyuden), Shikoku Electric Power Company (Yonden) and Kansai Electric Power Company (Kanden).

References 

Japan nuclear

Nuclear power stations in Japan
Nuclear reactors
Japan power